Becta, originally known as the British Educational Communications and Technology Agency, was a non-departmental public body (popularly known as a Quango) funded by the Department for Education and its predecessor departments, in the United Kingdom. It was a charity and a company limited by guarantee. The abolition of Becta was announced in the May 2010 post-election spending review. Government funding was discontinued in March 2011. Becta went into liquidation in April 2011.

Role
Becta was the lead agency in the United Kingdom for promotion and integration of information and communications technology (ICT) in education. Becta was a company limited by guarantee with charitable status. It was established in 1998 through the reconstitution of the National Council for Educational Technology (NCET), which oversaw the procurement of all ICT equipment and e-learning strategy for schools.

Policy 
Foremost among the 2005–2008 Becta strategic objectives were "to influence strategic direction and development of national education policy to best take advantage of technology" and "to develop a national digital infrastructure and resources strategy leading to greater national coherence."

National Grid for Learning
The National Grid for Learning (NGfL) was managed by Becta and was set up as a gateway to educational resources on to support schools and colleges across the UK. The NGfL portal was launched in November 1998, as one of several new programmes initiated by the new Labour government which took office in May 1997 and had a linked budget of earmarked funds to be spent on schools' internet connections and ICT.

Purchasing Frameworks
Becta awarded certain vendors placement on approved "purchasing frameworks":  

The purchasing frameworks were criticised as being outdated, and for effectively denying schools the option of benefiting from both free and open source and the value and experience of small and medium ICT companies. Participating companies had to have a net worth of at least £700,000 to qualify and had to satisfy a list of functional requirements. A concern was raised about the "over-comfortable relationship the government has with some of the bigger players."

In January 2007, Crispin Weston, who had helped Becta draw up the criteria used to select suppliers, asked the EC Competition Commission to investigate his allegation that a significant number of the successful tenders had failed to implement the mandatory functional requirements, including particular aspects of inter-operability. He also added in his letter to the Commission that they should take action on the further issue of:

See also
 Self-review framework

References

External links 
 Archived Becta website
 Generator – technology improvement leadership tool for FE and Skills
 Digital Education Resource Archive (DERA) holds an archive of Becta publications.

Video clips
 Becta YouTube channel
 Next Generation YouTube channel

Computer science education in the United Kingdom
Department for Education
Defunct public bodies of the United Kingdom
Education in Coventry
Governmental educational technology organizations
Information technology education
Information technology organisations based in the United Kingdom
Organisations based in Coventry
Organizations established in 1998
Organizations disestablished in 2011
Public education in the United Kingdom
University of Warwick
1998 establishments in the United Kingdom
2011 disestablishments in the United Kingdom